The 2015 Mid-American Conference men's basketball tournament was a post-season basketball tournament for the Mid-American Conference (MAC) 2014–15 college basketball season. Tournament first-round games were held on campus sites at the higher seed on March 9. The remaining rounds were held at Quicken Loans Arena in Cleveland between March 11–14. University at Buffalo won the tournament and received the conference's automatic bid into the 2015 NCAA tournament.

Format
As with the recent tournaments, the top two seeds receive byes into the semifinals, with the three and four seeds receiving a bye to the quarterfinals.

Seeds

Schedule

Bracket

All-Tournament Team
Tournament MVP – Xavier Ford, Buffalo

References

External links
 2015 MAC Men's Basketball Tournament

Mid-American Conference men's basketball tournament
Tournament
MAC men's basketball tournament
MAC men's basketball tournament
Basketball competitions in Cleveland
College baseball tournaments in Ohio